Toppozabad may refer to:

 Toppozabad, Piranshahr
 Tupuzabad, Naqadeh